Simeone Di Cagno Abbrescia (born 1 April 1944) is an Italian politician, former mayor of Bari.

Biography 
Di Cagno Abbrescia graduated in Law at the University of Bari and, as an entrepreneur, worked in the real estate and tourism sectors.

He joined Forza Italia since its foundation. He has been elected mayor of Bari in 1995, and was reconfirmed in 1999, holding the position until 2004. After the 2006 elections, he was elected for the Chamber of Deputies with Forza Italia, where he was reconfirmed on the 2008 elections with The People of Freedom.

In 2009 he was again the mayoral candidate of Bari, supported by the centre-right coalition, being defeated by the incumbent mayor Michele Emiliano.

On 20 March 2018, the Apulian Regional Council, renewed the board of Apulian Aqueduct, appointing Di Cagno Abbrescia as new president.

References

External links 
Files about his parliamentary activities (in Italian): XV, XVI legislature.

1944 births
Living people
Forza Italia politicians
Mayors of Bari
Deputies of Legislature XV of Italy
Deputies of Legislature XVI of Italy
20th-century Italian politicians
21st-century Italian politicians